Michael Patrick Hobin (born February 21, 1954) is a Canadian former professional ice hockey player who played in the World Hockey Association (WHA). Drafted in the thirteenth round of the 1974 NHL amateur draft by the Montreal Canadiens, Hobin opted to play in the WHA after being selected by the Vancouver Blazers in the seventh round of the 1974 WHA Amateur Draft. He played parts of two WHA seasons for the Phoenix Roadrunners.
Hobin also in Austria for two seasons for EC Villacher SV.

Awards
1974–75 SHL Rookie of the Year

References

External links

1954 births
Living people
Canadian ice hockey centres
Charlotte Checkers (SHL) players
EC VSV players
Hamilton Red Wings (OHA) players
Sportspeople from Sarnia
Montreal Canadiens draft picks
Nova Scotia Voyageurs players
Oklahoma City Blazers (1965–1977) players
Phoenix Roadrunners (WHA) players
Tucson Mavericks players
Tulsa Oilers (1964–1984) players
Vancouver Blazers draft picks
Ice hockey people from Ontario
Canadian expatriate ice hockey players in Austria
Canadian expatriate ice hockey players in the United States